Hold Your Fire is the twelfth studio album by Canadian rock band Rush, released on September 8, 1987. It was recorded at The Manor Studio in Oxfordshire, Ridge Farm Studio in Surrey, Air Studios in Montserrat and McClear Place in Toronto. Hold Your Fire was the last Rush studio album released outside Canada by PolyGram/Mercury. 'Til Tuesday bassist and vocalist Aimee Mann contributed vocals to "Time Stand Still" and appeared in the Zbigniew Rybczyński-directed video.  

The album was not as commercially successful as most of the band's releases of the 1980s, peaking at number 13 on the Billboard charts, the lowest chart peak for a Rush album since 1978's Hemispheres. However, it was eventually certified Gold by the RCAA.

Writing
After Rush's 1986 Power Windows tour ended, the band members took the summer off to spend more time with their families. A few months passed, and the group decided to start getting back into writing material. Neil Peart began writing lyrics in a cottage in early September. Meanwhile, Geddy Lee started to compose on his keyboard setup controlled on a Macintosh computer using software called Digital Performer, which would be useful for both the writing and production stages, and Alex Lifeson was doing experimental tapes at home. Peart also used the Mac to write some lyrics for the album. Peart wanted to do something in the same vein as Power Windows, this time working around the theme of time. However, after writing lyrics for the first song he wrote, "Time Stand Still", Peart started to create more material that would turn the theme into "Instinct," which was the reason for titling the album Hold Your Fire. In an afternoon later that month, Peart and Lee together showed what they had been working on, and also discussed a few lyrical ideas they weren't able to write on paper, which would be included in "Mission," "Open Secrets" and "Turn the Page."

The group started writing sessions in Elora Sound Studio, Ontario on September 27, 1986. Lifeson showed his experimental tapes, while Lee brought soundcheck jams he had done that year. According to Peart, Lifeson's tapes "would yield some good parts for several songs" and Lee's soundcheck jams were "sorted and labeled as potential verses, bridges, choruses or instrumental bits, and thus they served as a reference library of spontaneous ideas that could be drawn upon at will." Lifeson used a drum machine to write drum parts, which Lee tracked on a Lerxst Sound recorder. By early November, eight songs had been written, which the group felt wasn't enough for the album to have a good amount of musical variety. Peart said, "We decided we'd go a bit further this time. We were aware of the fact that only a small percentage of people actually buy records anymore, the vast majority choosing cassettes or CDs. Thus, we figured, why should we worry about the time limitations of the old vinyl disc? We thought we'd like to have 10 songs, and go for 50 minutes or so of music. So we did." Producer Peter Collins came in to Elora Sound in early December to give the band suggestions to improve the songs. Among many small changes, a couple of major suggestions were new verses to "Mission" and chorus revisions to "Open Secrets." With nine songs already written, Collins also suggested the band make a 10th track for the album, and the song "Force Ten" would be written on the last day of pre-production, December 14.

Production
Recording of Hold Your Fire began January 5, 1987, at The Manor Studio in England. This was where the drums, bass, basic keyboards, lead guitars and lead vocals were recorded. The keyboards, guitars and vocals were recorded digitally, while the drums and bass, as preferred by Peart, were taped using an analog tape recorder, later converted into a digital tape. On February 7, the band went to Ridge Farm Studio for Andy Richards to perform additional dynamic keyboards and exciting "events," as well as put all recorded instrument tracks into a digital machine. Lifeson was also able to write guitar overdubs while recording at Ridge Farm.

The band headed off to AIR Montserrat on March 1 to start producing guitar overdubs, and later to McClear Place Studios in Toronto three weeks later to finish the overdubs, record orchestral arrangements by Steve Margoshes for "High Water," "Mission" and "Second Nature," and track additional voice parts, such as Aimee Mann's vocals for "Time Stand Still" and "Prime Mover," and gospel choir. Recording was finished by April 24, and mixing took place starting May 7 at William Tell Studio in Paris. Lee mastered the album with Bob Ludwig at Masterdisk in New York City by mid-July.

Lee played a Wal bass guitar for Hold Your Fire, as well as being vocalist and keyboardist. The synths and other electronic instruments and devices used, all programmed with the assistance of Andy Richards and Jim Burgess, were several Akai S900 samplers, two Prophet synths, a PPG 2.3, a Roland Super Jupiter and a D-550, two Yamaha KX-76 MIDI controllers, two QX-I sequencers and a DX-7, two MIDI Mappers, Korg MIDI pedals, and Moog Taurus Pedals. Peart played on a combination of Ludwig-Musser drum set, a plated-hardware of Pearl Drums, Premier drums and Tama drums, Avedis Zildjian cymbals, and a Simmons pad through one of the Akai samplers, which made sounds of temple blocks, a timbale, crotales, a Tama, a gong bass drum, cowbells, wind chimes, and marimbas.

The song "Tai Shan" was an experiment in composition. It was influenced by classical Chinese music, and its title was a reference to Mount Tai in China's Shandong province, which Peart first became aware of during a bicycle trip in China. A backward sample of Aimee Mann's vocals from another track is used at the end of the song. In a 2009 interview with Blender, Lee expressed regret in including "Tai Shan" on the album, calling it an "error" and saying "we should have known better." Lifeson called the song "a little corny" in a 2012 interview with Total Guitar. In an interview in 2016 about the worst songs Rush had released, Lifeson said "'Tai Shan' is one of the worst, easily. And 'Panacea' - it was an attempt at something that didn't really work out. It was... innocent."

Reception

Reception to Hold Your Fire has been mixed to positive. While the album has been criticised for its 1980s pop music sound and overused synths, some, including the band members felt it was better than their previous studio projects with praises of the album's production, composition, and lyrics.

Hold Your Fire was initially deemed a commercial disappointment in comparison to other Rush albums. It stalled at number 13 in the Billboard 200 album chart, the first time a Rush studio album failed to reach the Top 10 since 1978's Hemispheres. Although Hold Your Fire was certified gold in the United States shortly after its release, it failed to reach platinum status according to the RIAA, becoming the first Rush studio album to not do so since 1975's Caress of Steel.

Despite its poor commercial showing, it retains a cult following. Luke Henson of The PROG Mind touted its "lush, warm production", "profound lyrics dealing with age, the natural world, optimism, cynicism, and enjoying life", and "fabulous bass work". Rob Pociluk of Progressive Music Planet said that "Lyrically, I think this album is some of Neil’s best work." Both critics ranked it as their favorite Rush album.

Reissues
A remaster was issued in 1997.
The tray has a picture of three fingerprints, light blue, pink, and lime green (left to right) with "The Rush Remasters" printed in all capital letters just to the left, mirroring the cover art of Retrospective II. All remasters from Moving Pictures through A Show of Hands are like this.
 Includes all the artwork that came with the original album, except for the lyrics to "Prime Mover".

Hold Your Fire was remastered again in 2011 by Andy VanDette for the "Sector" box sets, which re-released all of Rush's Mercury-era albums. It is included in the Sector 3 set. For the 2011 remaster, master tapes containing different mixes of Hold Your Fire were inadvertently used, with the result that the mix is noticeably different from previous releases in several places; particularly during "Mission", where string parts that were not present on the original release can be heard, and in the introduction to "Tai Shan", where wind chimes have been added. There is also a panning stereo effect on the vocals during the first pre-chorus of "Turn the Page" which is absent from the original mix.

In 2015 it was reissued after being remastered by Sean Magee at Abbey Road Studios following a direct approach by Rush to remaster their entire back catalogue.

Track listing

Personnel
Sources:

Rush
Geddy Lee – bass guitar, synthesizer, vocals
Alex Lifeson – electric and acoustic guitar
Neil Peart – drums, percussion

Additional musicians
Aimee Mann – co-lead vocals on "Time Stand Still", backing vocals on "Tai Shan", "Open Secrets" and "Prime Mover"
Andy Richards – additional keyboard, synthesizer programming
Steven Margoshes – strings arranger and conductor
The William Faery Engineering Brass Band arranged and conducted by Andrew Jackman

Production
Peter Collins – producer, arrangements
James "Jimbo" Barton – engineer
Bob Ludwig – mastering
Hugh Syme – art direction
Glen Wexler – photography

Charts

Weekly charts

Year-end charts

Singles and chart positions

Certifications

References

Further reading

External links
 

Rush (band) albums
1987 albums
Anthem Records albums
Mercury Records albums
Vertigo Records albums
Albums produced by Peter Collins (record producer)